Casino Nanaimo may refer to:

 Casino Nanaimo, a casino in Nanaimo, British Columbia run by the Great Canadian Gaming Corporation
 "Casino Nanaimo", a 2007 single by The Besnard Lakes, named after the above casino